Juan Manuel González Torres is a Colombian politician. He served as governor of the Colombian department of Meta from 2006 until 2007.

References

Living people
Meta Department
Year of birth missing (living people)